Rohan Bopanna and Matwé Middelkoop defeated Santiago González and Andrés Molteni in the final, 6–2, 6–4 to win the doubles tennis title at the 2022 Tel Aviv Open.

This was the first edition of an ATP Tour event in Tel Aviv since 1996.

Seeds

Draw

Draw

References

External links 
Main draw

Tel Aviv Open - Doubles
2022 Doubles